Robert Peter Davies-Jones is a British atmospheric scientist who substantially advanced understanding of supercell and tornado dynamics and of tornadogenesis. A theoretician, he utilized numerical simulations as well as storm chasing field investigations in his work as a longtime research meteorologist at the National Severe Storms Laboratory (NSSL) in Norman, Oklahoma.

Davies-Jones received a B.Sc. in physics from the University of Birmingham in 1964 and a Ph.D. in astrophysics from the University of Colorado Boulder in 1969. From 1969 to 1970 Davies-Jones did a post-doc at the National Center for Atmospheric Research (NCAR) before embarking on a long career at NSSL in 1970. He retired from NSSL in 2009 where he remains an emeritus researcher and continues to publish some papers. Davies-Jones is a Fellow of the American Meteorological Society (AMS). Davies-Jones earned the NOAA Distinguished Career Award and in 2018 the Nikolai Dotzek Lifetime Achievement Award by the European Severe Storms Laboratory (ESSL).

See also 
 Joseph B. Klemp
 Paul Markowski
 Erik N. Rasmussen

References

External links 
 

British meteorologists
American meteorologists
Alumni of the University of Birmingham
University of Colorado Boulder alumni
Storm chasers
Living people
Year of birth missing (living people)
Fellows of the American Meteorological Society